Class G: Geography, Anthropology, Recreation is a classification used by the Library of Congress Classification system. This article outlines the subclasses of Class G.

G - Geography (General); Atlases; Maps 

1-922....................Geography (General)
65-69...................Geographers
70-70.6.................Philosophy. Relation to other topics. Methodology
80-99...................History of geography
100.5-108.5.............Toponymy (Including gazetteers, geographic names and terms)
140.....................Great cities of the world
141.....................Historical geography
142.....................Aerial geography
149-180.................Travel. Voyages and travels (General)
154.9-155.8............Travel and state. Tourism
200-336.................History of discoveries, explorations, and travel
369-503.................Special voyages and travels
521-539.................Adventures, shipwrecks, buried treasure, etc.
540-550.................Seafaring life, ocean travel, etc.
575-890.................Arctic and Antarctic regions
905-910.................Tropics (General)
912-922.................Northern and Southern Hemispheres
1000-3122................Atlases
1000-1000.5.............Atlases of the moon, planets, etc.
1001-1046...............World atlases. Atlases of the Earth
1050-1052...............Northern and Southern Hemispheres
1053....................Tropics. Torrid Zone
1054-1055...............Polar regions. Frigid Zone
1059-1061...............Maritime atlases (General)
1100-3102...............By region or country
1100-1779..............Americas. Western Hemisphere
1105-1692.............North America
1110-1114............Greenland
1115-(1193)..........Canada
1200-1534.24.........United States
1535-1537............ Caribbean area
1540-1542............Latin America (General)
1545-1549............Mexico
1550-(1594)..........Central America
1600-1692............West Indies
1700-1779............South America
1780-2799.............Eastern Hemisphere. Eurasia, Africa, etc.
1791-2196.............Europe
2110-2196............Former Soviet Republics. Union of Soviet Socialist Republics (U.S.S.R.). Russia (Empire)
2200-2444.84..........Asia
2445-2739.............Africa
2740-2799.............Australasia
2800-3064.............Oceans (General)
3100-3102.............Antarctica
3122....................Atlases of imaginary, literary, and mythological regions, etc., A-Z

3160-3171................Globes

3180-9980................Maps

3180-3182...............Universe. Solar system
3190-3191...............Celestial maps
3195-3197...............Moon
3200-3202...............World. Earth
3210-3221...............Northern and Southern Hemispheres
3240-3241...............Tropics. Torrid Zone
3250-3251...............Temperate Zone
3260-3272...............Polar regions. Frigid Zone
3290-9880...............By region or country
3290-5667..............Americas. Western Hemisphere
3300-5184.............North America
3380-3384............Greenland
3400-(3612)..........Canada
3700-4384............United States
4390-4392............Caribbean area
4410-4763............Mexico
4800-4874............Central America
4900-5184............West Indies
5200-5667.............South America
5670-8904..............Eastern Hemisphere. Eurasia, Africa, etc.
5700-7342.............Europe
7000-7342............Former Soviet Republics. Union of Soviet Socialist Republics (U.S.S.R.). Russia (Empire)
7400-8198.54..........Asia
8200-8904.............Africa
8950-9084..............Australasia
9095-9794..............Oceans (General)
9800-9804..............Antarctica
9900-9980..............Unlocalized maps

GA - Mathematical geography; Cartography 
1-1776..........Mathematical geography. Cartography
51-87..........Surveys (General)
101-1776.......Cartography
109...........Aerial cartography
109.5.........Cadastral mapping
109.8.........Statistical mapping
110-115.......Projection
125-155.......Map drawing, modeling, printing, reading, etc.
192-197.3.....Collections of maps, globes, etc. Map libraries
197.5-198.....Cartographers
260-288.......Globe making. Globes
300-325.......World maps, general atlases, etc.
341-1776......Maps. By region or country

GB - Physical geography 
3-5030................Physical geography
400-649..............Geomorphology. Landforms. Terrain
447.................Climatic geomorphology
448.................Slopes
450-460.............Coasts
461-468.995.........Reefs
471-478.995.........Islands
500-555.............Mountains. Orography
561-649.............Other natural landforms: Floodplains, caves, deserts, dunes, etc.
651-2998.............Hydrology. Water
980-2998............Ground and surface waters
980-992............Watersheds. Runoff. Drainage
1001-1199.8........Groundwater. Hydrogeology
1201-1598..........Rivers. Stream measurements
1601-2398..........Lakes. Limnology. Ponds. Lagoons
2401-2598..........Ice. Glaciers. Ice sheets. Sea ice
2601-2798..........Snow. Snow surveys
2801-2998..........Hydrometeorology
5000-5030............Natural disasters

GC - Oceanography 
1-1581............Oceanography
63...............Oceanographic expeditions
65-78............Underwater exploration
83-87.6..........Submarine topography
96-97.8..........Estuarine oceanography
100-103..........Seawater
103-149..........Chemical oceanography
150-182..........Physical oceanography
151-255.........Density
160-177.........Temperature
177.6-182.......Optical oceanography
190-190.5........Ocean-atmosphere interaction
200-376..........Dynamics of the ocean
205-227.........Waves
218.5-228.6.....Ocean circulation
229-296.8.......Currents
297-299.........Water masses and oceanic mixing
300-376.........Tides
377-399..........Marine sediments
401-881..........Oceanography. By region
1000-1023........Marine resources. Applied oceanography
1080-1581........Marine pollution. Sea water pollution

GE - Environmental Sciences 

1-350.......Environmental Sciences
70-90......Environmental Education
170-190....Environmental Policy
195-199....Environmentalism. Green Movement
300-350....Environmental Management

GF - Human ecology; Anthropogeography 

1-900.......Human ecology. Anthropogeography
51.........Environmental influences on humans
75.........Human influences on the environment
101-127....Settlements
125.......Cities. Urban geography
127.......Rural settlements. Rural geography
500-900....By region or country

GN - Anthropology 

1-890.............Anthropology
49-298...........Physical anthropology. Somatology
51-59...........Anthropometry
62.8-265........Human variation (Including growth, physical form, skeleton, nervous system, skin, etc.)
269-279.........Race (General)
280.7...........Man as an animal. Simian traits versus human traits
281-289.........Human evolution
282-286.7.......Fossil man. Human paleontology
296-296.5.......Medical anthropology
301-674..........Ethnology. Social and cultural anthropology
357-367.........Culture and cultural processes (Including social change, structuralism, diffusion, etc.)
378-396.........Collected ethnographies
397-397.7.......Applied anthropology
406-517.........Cultural traits, customs, and institutions
406-442........Technology. Material culture (Including food, shelter, fire, tools, etc.)
448-450.8......Economic organization. Economic anthropology
451-477.7......Intellectual life (Including communication, recreation, philosophy, religion, knowledge, etc.)
478-491.7......Social organization
492-495.2......Political organization. Political anthropology
495.4-498......Societal groups, ethnocentrism, diplomacy, warfare, etc.
502-517........Psychological anthropology
537-674.........Ethnic groups and races
550-674.........By region or country
700-890..........Prehistoric archaeology

GR - Folklore 

1-950..........Folklore
72-79.........Folk literature (General) Including folktales, legends
81............Folk beliefs, superstitions, etc. (General)
99.6-390......By region or country
420-950.......By subject
420-426......Costume, jewelry
430-488......Folklore relating to private life (Including dreams, love, children, nursery rhymes, etc.)
500-615...... Supernatural beings, demonology, fairies, ghosts, charms, etc.
620-640......Cosmic phenomena, weather lore
650-690......Geographical topics
700-860......Animals, plants, and minerals
865-874......Transportation, travel, commerce, etc.
880..........Medicine. Folk medicine
890-915......Occupations
931-935......Signs and symbols
940-941......Mythical places

GT - Manners and customs (General) 

1-7070............Manners and customs (General)
165-476..........Houses. Dwellings
485..............Churches and church going
495-499..........Human body and its parts. Personal beauty
500-2370.........Costume. Dress. Fashion
2400-3390.5......Customs relative to private life (Including children, marriage, eating and drinking,  funeral customs, etc.)
3400-5090........Customs relative to public and social life (Including town life, court life, festivals, holidays, ceremonies of royalty, etc.)
5220-5286.......Customs relative to transportation and travel
5320-6737.......Customs relative to special classes
5320-5690......By birth, rank, etc.
5750-6390......By occupation

GV - Recreation; Leisure 

1-186................Recreation. Leisure
181.35-181.6........Recreation leadership. Administration of recreation services
182-182.5...........Recreational areas and facilities. Recreation centers
191.2-200.66.........Outdoor life. Outdoor recreation
191.68-198.975......Camping
198.945-198.975....Farm vacations, dude ranches, etc.
199-199.62..........Hiking. Pedestrian tours
199.8-200.35........Mountaineering
200.4-200.56........Orienteering. Wilderness survival
200.6-200.66........Caving. Spelunking
201-555..............Physical education and training
346-351.5...........School and college athletics. Intramural and interscholastic athletics
401-433.............Physical education facilities. Sports facilities (Including gymnasiums, athletic fields, playgrounds, etc.)
435-436.7...........Physical measurements. Physical tests, etc.
450-451.4...........Nudism. Sunbathing
460-555.............Gymnastics. Gymnastic exercises (Including calisthenics, heavy exercises, acrobatics, etc.)
557-1198.995.........Sports
711.................Coaching
712-725.............Athletic contests. Sports events
733-734.5...........Professionalism in sports. Professional sports (General)
735.................Umpires. Sports officiating
743-749.............Athletic and sporting goods, supplies, etc.
750-770.27..........Air sports: Airplane flying, kiteflying, bungee jumping, etc.
770.3-840...........Water sports: Canoeing, sailing, yachting, scuba diving, etc.
840.7-857...........Winter sports: Ice hockey, skiing, bobsledding, snowmobiling, etc.
861-1017............Ball games: Baseball, football, golf, etc.
1020-1034...........Automobile travel. Motoring. Automobile racing
1040-1060.4.........Cycling. Bicycling. Motorcycling
1060.5-1098.........Track and field athletics
1100-1150.9.........Fighting sports: Bullfighting, boxing, fencing, etc.
1151-1190...........Shooting. Archery
1195-1198.995.......Wrestling
1199-1570............Games and amusements
1201.5..............Hobbies (General)
1203-1220.8.........Children's games and amusements
1218.5-1220.8......Toys
1221-1469.63........Indoor games and amusements
1232-1299..........Card games: Poker, patience, whist, etc.
1301-1311..........Gambling. Chance and banking games
1312-1469..........Board games. Move games (Including chess, go, checkers, etc.)
1469.15-1469.62....Computer games. Video games. Fantasy games
1470-1511..........Parties. Party games and stunts
1491-1507.........Puzzles
1541-1561............Parlor magic and tricks

1564-1565............Darts

1580-1799.4..........Dancing

1800-1860............Circuses, spectacles, etc. (Including rodeos, waxworks, amusement parks, etc.)

References

Further reading 
 Full schedule of all LCC Classifications
 List of all LCC Classification Outlines Np

G